Rumble on the Docks is a 1956 American crime film noir directed by Fred F. Sears and starring James Darren.

Plot

Jimmy Smigelski, living near the docks of Brooklyn, is quick to help when a neighborhood girl, Della, and her little brother are menaced by some thugs. Joe Brindo, a racketeer Jimmy's honest father Pete blames for an incident that crippled him, is impressed by Jimmy and takes him under his wing.

Jimmy is caught in a rivalry between two local gangs. He also is asked to testify at a trial, angering his father when the outcome benefits the gangster. Jimmy eventually changes his ways and ends up working in his father's print shop.

Cast
 James Darren as Jimmy Smigelski
 Laurie Carroll as Della
 Michael Granger as Joe Brindo
 Jerry Janger as Rocky
 Robert Blake as Chuck
 Edgar Barrier as Pete Smigelski
 Celia Lovsky as Anna Smigelski
 David Bond as Dan Kevlin
 Timothy Carey as Frank Mangus
 Dan Terranova as 'Stomper' Tony Lightning
 Barry Froner as Poochie
 Don Devlin as Wimpy
 Stephen H. Sears as Cliffie
 Joseph Vitale as Ferd Marchesi
 David Orrick McDearmon as Lawyer Gotham (as David Orrick)
 Larry J. Blake as Officer Fitz
 Robert C. Ross as Gil Danco
 Steve Warren as Sully 
 Don Garrett as Bo-Bo
 Joel Ashley as Dist. Atty. Fuller 
 Salvatore Anthony as Kid with Wallet
 Freddie Bell as Himself, Freddie Bell (as Freddie Bell and His Bellboys)
 The Bellboys as Themselves, The Bellboys (as Freddie Bell and His Bellboys)

Production
The film was based on the eponymous 1953 novel by "Frank Paley", a social worker writing under a pseudonym. The New York Times thought "Mr Paley's narrative powers are not up to his descriptive ones."

Sam Katzman bought the film rights in 1955.

The lead role was given to James Darren, who had recently been signed to a long-term contract by Columbia. It was his first movie. Katzman also introduced newcomers Laurie Carroll and Sal Anthony. Carroll was discovered by Katzman when she appeared on The Johnny Carson Show.

Filming started 18 June 1956.

Release
James Darren later said of the movie, "Fred Sears was a wonderful director. That really was my first break because I started getting 400-500 letters a month from that film. You're not talking about a major film here. So, that kind of put me on a different level at the studio and they took notice."

References

External links

Review of film at Variety

1956 films
1956 crime films
American crime films
Columbia Pictures films
Films directed by Fred F. Sears
1950s English-language films
1950s American films
American black-and-white films